is a railway station in Nobeoka, Miyazaki, Japan.

Lines

Layout 
The station consists of two side platforms serving two tracks at grade. There is no station building but weather shelters are provided on the platforms for passengers. Access to the opposite side platform is by a footbridge.

Adjacent stations

History
Japanese National Railways (JNR) opened the station on 11 February 1953 as an additional station on the existing track of the Nippō Main Line. With the privatization of JNR on 1 April 1987, the station came under the control of JR Kyushu.

Passenger statistics
In fiscal 2016, the station was used by an average of 4 passengers (boarding only) per day.

See also
List of railway stations in Japan

References

External links 

Kita-Nobeoka (JR Kyushu)

Railway stations in Miyazaki Prefecture
Railway stations in Japan opened in 1953
Nobeoka, Miyazaki